David James (born December 9, 1949) is an American sailor. He competed in the Flying Dutchman event at the 1968 Summer Olympics.

References

External links
 

1949 births
Living people
American male sailors (sport)
Olympic sailors of the United States
Sailors at the 1968 Summer Olympics – Flying Dutchman
Sportspeople from Newport News, Virginia